The udic moisture regime is common to soils of humid climates which have well-distributed rainfall, or which have enough rain in summer so that the amount of stored moisture plus rainfall is approximately equal to, or exceeds, the amount of evapotranspiration. Water moves down through the soil at some time in most years.

Some soil suborders, like udalf (alfisol) and udept (inceptisol), have an udic moisture regime.

See also
Pedogenesis
Pedology (soil study)
Soil classification
Soil science
Soil type
USDA soil taxonomy
Ustic (Soil Moisture Regime)

References

Pedology